Basil Wallace (born January 15, 1951) is a Jamaica-born American actor. He was born in Kingston and immigrated to the United States as a child. His family first settled in Brooklyn, New York City. He, his parents, and his siblings then moved to Long Island, where he attended Hempstead High School.

Wallace became interested in theater and, after graduating high school, entered New York University. He attended NYU for two years, during which time he performed in his first Off-Off-Broadway play. He went on to work for many years as a playwright, actor, and theatre director in New York.

Early in Wallace's career, he became involved with La MaMa Experimental Theatre Club in Manhattan's East Village. He acted in a production, called "Short Bullins", of four Ed Bullins one-act plays at La MaMa in 1972. The Jarboro Company then took those one-acts (How Do You Do?, A Minor Scene, Dialect Determinism, and It Has No Choice, along with Bullins' Clara's Old Man and Richard Wesley's Black Terror) on tour to Italy. He also acted in Clifford Mason's Sister Sadie, directed by Allie Woods at La MaMa in 1972.

Wallace co-wrote (with Angela Marie Lee) and directed the play Sounds of a Silent Man at La MaMa in 1973, and directed Edgar White's Lament for Rastafari at La MaMa in 1977. He returned to La MaMa in 1987 to direct a work-in-progress reading of White's Tres Cepas (The Love Songs for China).

Wallace taught at Lincoln Center Theater for a decade, was the drama director for School District 13 in the Bronx, and was the director of Mini-Mobile Theatre for two years. He was one of the founding members and served as artistic director for the first year of the Caribbean American Repertory Theatre.

In 1990, he moved to Los Angeles and auditioned for the film Marked for Death. He was cast as the lead villain, Screwface. Wallace has continued to act in film and television throughout the 1990s and 2000s.

Filmography

Film

Television

References

External links 
 
 Basil Wallace's official website
 Wallace's page on La MaMa Archives Digital Collections

1951 births
Living people
African-American male actors
American male film actors
American male television actors
American actors of Jamaican descent
Emigrants from British Jamaica to the United States
Male actors from New York City
People from Kingston, Jamaica
People from Hempstead (town), New York
20th-century American male actors
21st-century American male actors
People from Brooklyn
20th-century African-American people
21st-century African-American people